The Song of the Blood-Red Flower is a 1971 Finnish romance and drama film, and the fifth adaptation of Johannes Linnankoski's 1905 novel of the same name. Film tells the story of a glib log driver Olof Koskela, who keeps sowing his wild oats, and when the time comes for him to settle down he finds it difficult to trust anyone in view of his fickle past. Film is directed by Mikko Niskanen and it stars Pertti Melasniemi, Marjukka Arasola, Aune Hurme-Virtanen, Anna-Maija Kokkinen, and Marjatta Pasanen as Kyllikki Moisio. The film is the only color film ever made on the basis of the novel.

Cast
 Pertti Melasniemi as Olof Koskela
 Marjukka Arasola as "Hawthorn"
 Aune Hurme-Virtanen as Olof's mother
 Anna-Maija Kokkinen as "Daisy"
 Sirkka Korhonen as woman in the restaurang
 Soili Markkanen as "Rowan"
 Marjatta Pasanen as Kyllikki Moisio
 Regina Pekkola as "Clematis"
 Marjatta Saraheimo as "Pansy"
 Marjut Sariola as "Gazelle"
 Milla Vuolle as prostitute
 Leena Åkerlund as Annikki/"Forest Fairy"
 Mikko Niskanen as log driver (cameo)

Sources
Kääpä, Pietari. Directory of World Cinema: Finland. Intellect 2012, p. 25.

References

External links
 

1971 films
1971 romantic drama films
Finnish romantic drama films
1970s Finnish-language films
Films based on Finnish novels